The 2020–21 season was the 98th season in the existence of Vitória S.C. and the club's 14th consecutive season in the top-flight of Portuguese football. In addition to the domestic league, Vitória de Guimarães participated in this season's editions of the Taça de Portugal and the Taça da Liga. The season covers the period from 26 July 2020 to 30 June 2021.

Players

First-team squad

Out on loan

Transfers

In

Out

Pre-season and friendlies

Competitions

Overview

Primeira Liga

League table

Results summary

Results by round

Matches
The league fixtures were announced on 28 August 2020.

Taça de Portugal

Taça da Liga

Notes

References

Vitória S.C. seasons
Vitória